Rikuto Tamai ( Tamai Rikuto, born 11 September 2006) is a Japanese diver.

In April 2019, he became the youngest ever national indoor diving champion. In September of the same year, he became the youngest ever national diving champion.

He was one of the youngest Japanese competitors at the 2020 Summer Olympic Games in Tokyo.

References 

2006 births
Living people
People from Takarazuka, Hyōgo
Japanese male divers
Olympic divers of Japan
Divers at the 2020 Summer Olympics
World Aquatics Championships medalists in diving
21st-century Japanese people